Bolognesi Airport  is an airport serving the village of Bolognesi (es), capital of the Tahuanía District (es) in the Ucayali Region of Peru. The runway is just east of the village, which is near an oxbow of the Ucayali River.

See also

Transport in Peru
List of airports in Peru

References

External links
OpenStreetMap - Bolognesi
FallingRain - Tahuania

Airports in Peru
Buildings and structures in Ucayali Region